Waru is a 2006 Japanese action film directed by Takashi Miike. The sequel, Waru: kanketsu-hen, followed later in the year.

Cast
Show Aikawa as Yoji Himuro
Nagare Hagiwara as Luo
Yoshihiko Hakamada as Genji
Ryo Ishibashi as Sakuragi
Hisao Maki
Keiko Matsuzaka as Reiko Misugi
Johnny Okura
Hitoshi Ozawa
Atsuko Sakuraba
Hideki Sone
Kimika Yoshino
Akira Maeda
Satoru Sayama
Guts Ishimatsu

External links
 

Films directed by Takashi Miike
2000s Japanese films